Real Oviedo Femenino, officially named as Oviedo Moderno Club de Fútbol, is a Spanish women's football club based in Oviedo, Asturias. It acts as the women's section of Real Oviedo.

History

Founded in 1980 as México-La Corredoria CF to play a friendly match in the local midsummer celebration, the team was officially registered two years later as Meseico-La Corredoria CF. It was subsequently renamed CFF Tradehi (1984) and Peña Azul Oviedo (1996) before taking the name of Oviedo Moderno CF in 2001.

In 1990 Tradehi was promoted to the 8-teams División de Honor, the top national category back then, and in 2001 Oviedo Moderno was one of the eleven founding members of the unified premier league. Always a bottom half team, its best result in the nine seasons it has spent in the new championship was an eighth place in 2003. The team was relegated in 2008 and 2011, and spent the two next seasons Segunda División. In the first one, Oviedo Moderno topped its group but lost to CD Femarguín in the promotion play-offs.

In the 2012–13 season, Oviedo Moderno won again its group but was beaten by Granada CF in its second attempt to promote. However, the club promoted to Primera División due to the existence of a vacant berth in the league.

Oviedo Moderno remained in the top tier three more seasons before its relegation to Segunda División in 2016.

On 28 August 2017, Oviedo Moderno signed an agreement with local men's club Real Oviedo for using their name and their blue and white colors, instead of the club's black and green, since the 2017–18 season, with the aim to be completely integrated into the structure of the club for the 2018–19 season onwards.

Season to season

Titles

Invitational
 Menton Tournament
 2011, 2012

References

External links
Official website 

Women's football clubs in Spain
Association football clubs established in 1980
Sport in Oviedo
1980 establishments in Spain
Football clubs in Asturias
Real Oviedo
Primera División (women) clubs
Segunda Federación (women) clubs
Primera Federación (women) clubs